Nohuj (also Romanized as Nohūj and Nahūj) is a village in Barzavand Rural District, in the Central District of Ardestan County, Isfahan Province, Iran. At the 2006 census, its population was 572, in 178 families.

References 

Populated places in Ardestan County